Queensland Pops Orchestra is an Australian orchestra founded by Colin Harper

The Queensland Pops Orchestra had its first performance on the 31 December 1984 at the Lyric Theatre in South Brisbane, Queensland. This was also the first show at the Queensland Performing Arts Centre which officially opened in April 1985.

Shows put on by Queensland Pops Orchestra include the Vienna Pops series the Scotland the Brave series and the Best of British concerts.

The 2000 ABC Classics album release of highlights of one of their Scotland the Brave concerts was nominated for the 2001 ARIA Award for Best Cast or Show Album.

Awards and nominations

ARIA Music Awards
The ARIA Music Awards is an annual awards ceremony that recognises excellence, innovation, and achievement across all genres of Australian music. They commenced in 1987. 

! 
|-
| 2001
| Scotland the Brave
| Best Original Cast or Show Album
| 
| 
|-

References

External links
Queensland Pops Orchestra

Australian orchestras